Rabbula was a bishop of Edessa from 411 to August 435 AD, noteworthy for his opposition to the views of Theodore of Mopsuestia and Nestorius. However, his successor Ibas, who was in charge of the school of Edessa, reversed the official stance of that bishopric. Rabbula is not to be confused with the otherwise unknown scribe of the 6th century Rabbula Gospels. Venerated as a Saint by Eastern Orthodox Church (feast December 20) and Syriac Orthodox Church (feast December 17/19, August 8, and Third Wednesday after The Easter.

Sources 
The Life of Rabbula is a biographical Syriac text of Rabbula's life from the beginning of his birth to his life achievements and ends with his death. The text was first translated from Syriac into English and published by J. J. Overbeck in his S. Ephraemi Syri Rabulae Episcopi Edesseni Balaei Aliorumque opera selecta (1865). The Syriac parchment was found stored in the British Museum and is dated to the sixth century AD.

Early life 
He was a native of Qinnasrin, ancient Chalcis ad Bellum, a town some few miles south of Aleppo and the seat of a bishopric. His father was a pagan priest, and though his mother was a devoted Christian he remained a pagan until some time after his marriage. During a journey to his country estates he was converted to Christianity partly through coming in contact with a case of miraculous healing and partly through the teaching and influence of Eusebius, bishop of Kenneschrin, and Acacius, bishop of Aleppo.

Christian asceticism 
With all the energy of his fiery nature he threw himself into the practice of Christian asceticism, sold all his possessions, and separated from his wife and kinspeople. He resided for some time in a monastery, and then passed to a life of greater hardship as a solitary hermit. On the death of Diogenes, bishop of Edessa, in the year 411-412 Rabbula was chosen his successor, and at once accepted the position offered him, without any of the customary show of reluctance.

As a bishop Rabbula was marked by extraordinary energy, by the continued asceticism of his personal life, by his magnificent provision for all the poor and suffering in his diocese, by his care for discipline among the clergy and monks who were under his authority, and by the fierce determination with which he combated all heresies and especially the growing school of the followers of Nestorius. On one occasion he visited Constantinople and there preached before Theodosius II (who was then favorable to Nestorius) and a great congregation a sermon in denunciation of Nestorian doctrine, of which a portion survives in the Syriac version. Rabbula became a friend of Cyril of Alexandria, with whom he corresponded, and whose treatise De recta fide he translated into Syriac. After a 24-year career as bishop, he died in August 435, and was succeeded by Ibas.

It has been argued by some scholars that this positive picture of Rabbula is not altogether accurate. According to the Life of Rabbula, immediately before becoming bishop of Edessa, Rabbula, in consort with another monk, Eusebius, the future bishop of Tella, went to Baalbek (Heliopolis) in Lebanon (Phoenicia Libanensis), one of the last areas with pagans in order to seek martyrdom by provoking the pagans. Rather than being killed, he was severely beaten. The Life of Rabbula claims that Rabbula was preserved from death on account of his destiny to hold the episcopate.

Writings 
The literary legacy of Rabbula is small in bulk. Perhaps his primary importance to the historian of Syriac literature lies in the zeal with which he strove to replace the Diatessaron or Gospel Harmony of Tatian with the four canonical Gospels, ordering that a copy of the latter should be placed in every church. The version survives in a British Museum manuscript. According to Overbeck he himself produced a version (or revision) of the New Testament in Syriac, known as the Peshitta. Rabbula's involvement may have been, a first step in the direction of the Philoxenian version. FC Burkitt went further and advanced the hypothesis that Rabbula, at least as regards the Gospels, actively helped in the translation of the current Peshitta text, using the Greek text as read in Antioch about 400. However, since then Arthur Vööbus has furnished evidence that the Peshitta predated Rabbula.

Recent research has revealed that the text of the "Evangelion Da-Mepharreshe", the Gospel text prepared by Rabulla, is indeed the text of the Old Syriac Curetonian Palimpset rather than the Peshitta. Burkitt and Lewis suggested as much by calling the Curetonian Version the "Evangelion Da-Mepharreshe". As the Peshitta predated Rabbula, this suggests Rabbula had no knowledge of the Gospel text of the Peshitta and prepared his own translation into Syriac from the Greek.

Veneration 
Although one can't see the Rabbula's name in the actual liturgic calendars of Catholic or Orthodox Churches, there is a feast of Saint Rabbula of Edessa (†436) under December 20 in the Greek Mineas from IX-XII centuries at the Saint Catherine's Monastery of the Mount Sinai. Syriac Orthodox Church celebrates his memory at December 17/19, August 8, and Third Wednesday after The Easter.

See also 
 Alexius of Rome, lived by begging during the episcopate of Bishop Rabbula.

References

Bibliography

External links
 
 Entry in ‘Catholic Encyclopedia’ on Rabbulas. Website newadvent.org.

Attribution

5th-century Syrian bishops
Syriac writers
Year of birth missing
435 deaths
Christian writers
Bishops of Edessa
5th-century Byzantine writers